The 2014 International Women's Club Championship, known for sponsorship reasons as the Nestlé Cup, was the third worldwide international women's football club tournament, held in Japan from 30 November to 6 December 2014.

São José won the final 2–0 against Arsenal.

Participating teams
Jiangsu Huatai from China won the last open spot by winning a qualifying tournament, called the Asian Women's Club Championship by some sources. As with the previous edition the UEFA Champions League winners Wolfsburg didn't participate.

Results

All times are local (UTC+9)

First round

Semifinals

Third place play-off

Final

Prize-pool
The total prize-pool was 10 million Yen (about $85,000) for all teams combined.

References

External links
Official website  

2014
2014 in women's association football
2014 in Japanese women's football
2014–15 in English women's football
2014 in Brazilian women's football
2014
2014–15 in Australian women's soccer
2014 in Chinese football